State Highway 63 (abbreviated SH-63) is a 96.7 mile (155.6 km) state highway in southeastern Oklahoma. It runs from U.S. Highway 69 in Kiowa to the Arkansas state line. SH-63 has one spur route, designated as SH-63A.

SH-63 was added to the state highway system on November 6, 1935 as a short link highway between Talihina and SH-2. The highway was gradually extended to its present length between then and 1960. When the current incarnation of SH-1 was established, the middle of SH-63 was turned over to the new highway, leaving SH-63 in two separate parts. The two sections were connected via a concurrency in the early 1980s.

Route description
SH-63 heads northeast from Kiowa, passing through Pittsburg and crossing under the Indian Nation Turnpike near Blanco. In Haileyville, it meets US-270/SH-1 and begins a concurrency with them. After passing through Hartshorne, US-270 splits off.

The SH-1/2/63 concurrency heads south for six miles (10 km). West of Buffalo Valley, SH-2 splits off to the south as SH-1/63 head east. In Talihina, the highways meet US-271, which SH-1 joins. SH-63 heads east alone, passing through Whitesboro and Muse. In Big Cedar, it crosses U.S. Highway 259. It then enters Ouachita National Forest and ends at the state line. Arkansas Highway 8 continues on to Mena.

History
State Highway 63 was first established on November 6, 1935 as a connection between SH-2 and US-271 in Talihina. On April 1, 1936, the highway was extended east to end at the Arkansas state line. This remained the highway's extent for the remainder of the 1930s and the 1940s.

The highway was extended west for the first time on August 4, 1952, when SH-63's western terminus was set at US-270 near Hartshorne. The highway was extended further west on January 29, 1960, bringing it to US-69 in Kiowa. The SH-63 of 1960 had the same basic route as that of the present day. Minor realignments to the highway occurred on September 6, 1962 northwest of the northern SH-2 junction, and through Haileyville and Hartshorne on August 3, 1964.

The current State Highway 1 was designated on February 5, 1968. The portion of highway between Haileyville and Talihina was made solely part of SH-1. This left SH-63 in two discontinuous sections, one between Kiowa and Haileyville and one from Talihina to the Arkansas line. This situation would persist for fifteen years. On July 7, 1983, SH-63 was restored between the two segments, forming the SH-1/63 concurrency. No further changes have occurred to the highway since.

Junction list

SH-63A

SH-63 has one lettered spur, SH-63A. SH-63A begins at SH-1/63 two miles (3 km) west of Talihina. It heads north for  before forking into two separate highways. The west fork goes to the Choctaw Nation hospital, while the east fork goes to the Oklahoma Veterans Center.

References

063
Transportation in Pittsburg County, Oklahoma
Transportation in Latimer County, Oklahoma
Transportation in Le Flore County, Oklahoma